The  (French) or  (Dutch) is a square in Brussels, Belgium. It is named in honour of François Anneessens, dean of the Nation of St. Christopher (one of the Guilds of Brussels), who was beheaded on the Grand-Place/Grote Markt (Brussels' main square) during a period of uprisings within the Austrian Netherlands.

The square is located halfway down the /, in the Midi–Lemonnier or Stalingrad Quarter (southern part of the City of Brussels). It is served by the premetro (underground tram) station Anneessens on lines 3 and 4.

History
Together with the seven streets that lead to it, the Place Anneessens was laid out in 1639 on the Voldersbempt or Pré aux Foulons; a secluded piece of meadow bordered by the /, the river Senne and a man-made arm of the river, called the "Lesser Senne".

Until the covering of the Senne (1867–1871), the square was the site of a famous flea market, known as the Old Market. Due to the construction of the Central Boulevards, which attracted a more affluent public, and complaints from local residents about "its filth and its fleas", in March 1873, Brussels' municipal council decided to transfer the Old Market to the Place du Jeu de Balle/Vossenplein in the Marolles/Marollen district, a function that square has kept to this day.

In 1870, the square was given the name of the liberal politician Joseph Lebeau. As early as 1889, it was renamed after François Anneessens, dean of the Nation of St. Christopher, who was beheaded in 1719 on the Grand-Place because of his resistance to innovations in city government detrimental to the power of the guilds and for his suspected involvement with uprisings within the Austrian Netherlands. A statue created in 1889 by the sculptor Thomas Vinçotte recalls Anneessens' memory.

Places of interest
On the western side, the square is dominated by the striking buildings of the former Municipal School no. 13, a building from 1880 in the neo-Flemish Renaissance style to the plans of the architect . The Lucien Cooremans Institute was also housed in the building.

Since November 2013, there has been a comic strip wall with a four-storey mural depicting a scene from Thorgal on the corner of the Place Anneessens and the /.

See also

 Neoclassical architecture in Belgium
 History of Brussels
 Belgium in "the long nineteenth century"

References

Notes

Bibliography
 
 
 

Squares in Brussels
City of Brussels
19th century in Brussels